Thomas Barnwall Martin (1784 – April 1847) was an Irish landowner and politician.

Martin was the eldest surviving son of Richard Martin, humanitarian and Member of Parliament for Galway County, by his first wife Elizabeth Vesey. Following an unhappy conclusion to a love affair with the daughter of a local chandler, Thomas left home to join the army. He served at the Siege of Badajoz (1812), Spain in 1812, where he was wounded severely.

Despite a personal commendation by the Duke of Wellington himself, Martin returned to Ireland where he later married, inherited the family estate centred at Ballynahinch Castle in Connemara, and successfully campaigned for his father's former seat in Parliament in 1832 and served in this position until his death.

Martin died as a result of famine fever, contracted while trying to save his tenants from the effects of the famine. His final words were "My God! What will become of my people?"

He was married to Julia Kirwan, daughter of Patrick Kirwan of Dalgan Park. She had a dowry of £15,000. They had one daughter, Mary Letitia Martin (d. 30 October 1850), an author who married Arthur G. Bell.

See also

 The Tribes of Galway

References 

 Humanity Dick, Shevawn Lynam, 1975.
 The Tribes of Galway, by Adrian James Martyn, Galway, 2001.
 The Parish church of St. Mary, Oughterard: The Background to Its Construction, with an Account of the Dispute Concerning Title to its Site, James Mitchell, J.G.A.& H.S., Volume 54, 2002,  pp. 35–54
 The Eccentric Member for Galway, Peter Phillips, 2003.
 The Battle of Rushveala: Origin and outcome of a faction fight at Oughterard, Co. Galway, on 8 December 1837, James Mitchell, J.G.A.& H.S., Volume 55, 2003, pp. 72–85.

External links 

1784 births
1847 deaths
British Army officers
British Army personnel of the Peninsular War
Members of the Parliament of the United Kingdom for County Galway constituencies (1801–1922)
Politicians from County Galway
UK MPs 1832–1835
UK MPs 1835–1837
UK MPs 1837–1841
UK MPs 1841–1847
Irish duellists
Irish officers in the British Army
Deaths from typhus
Infectious disease deaths in Ireland
Whig (British political party) MPs for Irish constituencies